Weber State University (pronounced  ) is a public university in Ogden, Utah. It was founded in 1889 as Weber Stake Academy. It is accredited by the Northwest Commission on Colleges and Universities.

History 

Weber State University was founded by the Church of Jesus Christ of Latter-day Saints as the Weber Stake Academy in 1889. "Weber" comes from the name of the county where the university is located. Weber County was named after John Henry Weber, an early fur trader. The university opened for students in 1889 with 98 students enrolled for classes  The first principal of Weber Stake Academy was Louis F. Moench; he served from 1889 to 1892 and again from 1894 to 1902. In the latter year, Moench was succeeded as principal by David O. McKay, who served in that position until 1908. From 1914 to 1917, James L. Barker was the principal of the Weber Stake Academy.

In the early 20th century, the school underwent multiple name changes: Weber Stake Academy from its founding in 1889, Weber Academy in 1902, Weber Normal College in 1918, and Weber College in 1922. By the late 1920s, however, the college was in financial difficulty, and the Church of Jesus Christ of Latter-day Saints faced four choices—transfer the college to a partnership of the city of Ogden and Weber County, transfer it to the University of Utah as a branch campus, transfer it to the state of Utah as a junior college, or shut it down. In 1931, the Utah Legislature passed a law providing for the acquisition of Weber College and Snow College from the Church of Jesus Christ of Latter-day Saints.

In 1933, Weber College became a state-supported junior college. In 1954, the college moved from its downtown location in Ogden to a spacious and scenic area in the southeast bench area of the city. The school became Weber State College in 1962, and in 1964 became a four-year college. It was a charter member of the Big Sky Conference  The first graduate program (accounting), was added  and it gained university status on 

Weber State University has developed into a major state undergraduate institution serving northern Utah and areas beyond, including American and international students.

Academics 

Weber State University offers more than 250 certificate and degree programs. They are offered through the following seven colleges:
College of Engineering, Applied Science and Technology
Telitha E. Lindquist College of Arts and Humanities
John B. Goddard School of Business & Economics
Jerry and Vickie Moyes College of Education
Dr. Ezekiel R. Dumke College of Health Professions
College of Science
College of Social & Behavioral Sciences

In addition to these primary colleges, the university offers several structured interdisciplinary programs. These include:
Asian Studies
Ethnic Studies
European Studies
Latin American Studies
Legal Studies
Neuroscience Program
Urban & Regional Planning
Women's Studies

Unstructured interdisciplinary degrees are overseen by the Bachelor of Integrated Studies department.

Locations 

There is an additional campus in Davis County and two centers in Morgan and Roy. In addition to its physical locations, Weber State University has been a pioneer in the development of online education for the Utah System of Higher Education. The Davis campus has three buildings, which host more than 300 classes per semester.

In 2013, Weber State opened WSU Downtown, an  building on 2314 Washington Blvd., which houses a WSU Wildcat Store, cafe, the WSU Small Business Development Center, Startup Ogden, and an open co-working space.

Weber State also has centers in Roy, Farmington, Kaysville, Clearfield, and Morgan, Utah, in addition to the Community Education Center in Ogden.

Athletics 

Weber State University's colors are purple and white and their nickname is the Wildcats. (Wildcat is an alternate name for the bobcat, a cat native to the area.) The teams participate in NCAA Division I in the Big Sky Conference; the football team (Football Championship Subdivision) plays at Stewart Stadium. The men's and women's basketball teams both play at the Dee Events Center. Additional athletic programs are men's and women's track and field, men's and women's golf, men's and women's tennis, and women's soccer, cheerleading, dance, volleyball, and softball.

When the University of Idaho and Boise State University left the Big Sky in 1996, Idaho State University in nearby Pocatello became Weber State's main rival in both football and basketball. Southern Utah University (in Cedar City) joined the Big Sky in 2012 and is the main in-state rival.

Portland Trail Blazers' legendary guard, Damian Lillard was drafted with the 6th overall pick in the 2012 NBA Draft. After a stellar season with Weber, Dame went on to a superstar career in the league, being the most notable alumni to ever play sports at Weber.

Weber State also has 18 club sports through Campus Recreation, including ice hockey, men and women's rugby, archery, baseball, billiards, bowling, cycling, fencing, martial arts, rodeo, rock climbing, skiing, snowboarding, swimming, weightlifting, wrestling, and lacrosse.

Student media 

Weber State University has an independent, student-run newspaper, The Signpost, which is published every Monday and Thursday, an online radio station, KWCR, Ogden's Radio Station, an undergraduate interdisciplinary literary journal, Metaphor, and a television news program, Weber State News, that broadcasts online. The national literature and culture journal, Weber Studies, is based at Weber State.

Notable alumni and administrators 
 Nolan D. Archibald – President & CEO of Black & Decker 1986 – 2010
 Mark Evans Austad – communications expert
Davion Berry (born 1991) – basketball player in the Israeli Basketball Premier League
 Joseph Bishop – past president of Weber State
 Fawn Brodie – author/historian
 Paul W Draper – Anthropologist, Mentalist, Speaker
 H. Tracy Hall – inventor of the industrial diamond
 Ronald L. Holt – professor of anthropology
 Ben Howland – basketball coach, Northern Arizona, Pittsburgh, UCLA, and Mississippi State
 Taron Johnson – professional football player NFL
 Phil Johnson – professional basketball coach
 David M. Kennedy – U.S. Secretary of the Treasury
 Damian Lillard – professional basketball player
 J. Willard Marriott – business magnate
 David O. McKay – past president of the Church of Jesus Christ of Latter-day Saints
 Wataru Misaka – BAA (Basketball Association of America) player in the 1940s
 Dick Motta – professional basketball coach
 Jerry Moyes - founder of Swift Transportation
 Sean O'Connell (attended) – professional Mixed Martial Artist
Todd Rose – current President of Populace, former Professor and Director of the Mind, Brain, and Education program at the Harvard Graduate School of Education
 Sarah Sellers – runner-up, 2018 Boston Marathon
 Richard H. Stallings – U.S. Representative
 Carla Taylor – women's basketball coach at Weber State
 Ernest L. Wilkinson – prominent lawyer and university president

Gallery

Notes

References

External links 

Weber State Athletics website
The Signpost

 
Educational institutions established in 1889
Universities and colleges formerly affiliated with the Church of Jesus Christ of Latter-day Saints
Universities and colleges accredited by the Northwest Commission on Colleges and Universities
Universities and colleges in Weber County, Utah
Tourist attractions in Ogden, Utah
Buildings and structures in Ogden, Utah
1889 establishments in Utah Territory
Public universities and colleges in Utah